Saville Craven Henry Ogle (1811 – 11 March 1854) was a British Whig politician.
Ogle was the son of reverend John Saville Ogle and Catherine Hannah Sneyd

Political Carear
Ogle was elected Whig MP for South Northumberland at the 1841 general election, and held the seat until 1852 when he stood down.

Marriage and children
on 31 December 1850, he married Mary Anne Wilson,

References

Ogle and Bothal; or, A history of the baronies of Ogle, Bothal, and Hepple, and of the families of Ogle and Bertram, who held possession of those baronies and other property in the county of Northumberland and elsewhere ... : to which is added accounts of several branch of families bearing the name of Ogle settled in other counties.
author: Ogle, Henry A.
A History of Northumberland
author: Northumberland County History Committee (England)

External links
 

UK MPs 1841–1847
UK MPs 1847–1852
Whig (British political party) MPs for English constituencies
1811 births
1854 deaths